The Four Shire Stone is a boundary marker that marks the place where the four historic English counties of Warwickshire, Oxfordshire, Gloucestershire, and Worcestershire once met. Since 1931, with a change to the boundaries of Worcestershire, only three of the counties meet at the stone.

Boundary marker

The Four Shire Stone is not a single stone, but a nine-foot high monument, built from the local Cotswold stone. The existing structure was probably built in the 18th century, and is a grade II listed building. There was an earlier "4 Shire Stone" on or near the site in 1675, almost certainly that illustrated in 1660. Thomas Habington's Survey of Worcestershire mentions "the stone which toucheth four sheeres, a thing rarely scene".

Five (formerly seven) civil parishes meet at the stone: 
 Moreton-in-Marsh to the west, in Gloucestershire;
 Formerly Batsford to the northwest, also in Gloucestershire, until Batsford/Moreton-in-Marsh boundary change in 1987;
 Formerly Lower Lemington to the north, also in Gloucestershire, and which merged into Batsford in 1935;
 Great Wolford to the north, in Warwickshire;
 Little Compton to the northeast, also in Warwickshire;
 Chastleton to the southeast, in Oxfordshire;
 Evenlode to the south, now also in Gloucestershire; until 1931 it was a detached part  of Worcestershire.

Most of Worcestershire is to the north-west of the stone. Thus the order of the four counties around the stone was different from what one might expect from a map of England. The stone ceased to be the meeting-point of four shires in 1931, when Evenlode was transferred to Gloucestershire, so since that date only three counties meet at the stone.

The J. R. R. Tolkien Society claims that the Four Shire Stone inspired the "Three-Farthing Stone" in J. R. R. Tolkien's book The Lord of the Rings. In that work, the Shire, the homeland of the hobbits is divided into four farthings, three of which meet at the "Three-Farthing Stone".

2022 restoration 

The failing state of this unique bit of local history inspired James Hayman-Joyce, a local, semi-retired chartered surveyor, to do what he could to restore it. He formed the Four Shire Stone Restoration Committee with the aim of raising £20,000 to restore the Four Shire Stone to its former glory. The project comprises restoring and repairing the stonework, replacing the railings and enhancing the engravings on all four sides of the pillar.

See also 

 Quadripoint
 Three Shires Oak, marking the meeting point of Derbyshire, Nottinghamshire and Yorkshire
 No Man's Heath, Warwickshire, meeting point of Leicestershire, Warwickshire, and Staffordshire
 Dow Bridge, meeting point of Warwickshire, Northamptonshire and Leicestershire

Notes

References

External links 
  Pictures of the Four shire stone.
 Four Shire Stone Restoration Project

Boundary markers
Quadripoints and higher
Cotswold District
West Oxfordshire District
Stratford-on-Avon District
History of Worcestershire
Monuments and memorials in Gloucestershire
Grade II listed buildings in Gloucestershire
Monuments and memorials in Oxfordshire
Grade II listed buildings in Oxfordshire
Monuments and memorials in Warwickshire
Grade II listed buildings in Warwickshire
18th-century architecture in the United Kingdom
Monumental columns in the United Kingdom
Moreton-in-Marsh
Geography of Warwickshire
Geography of Oxfordshire
Geography of Gloucestershire
Geography of Worcestershire